Moscow City Duma District 12 is one of 45 constituencies in Moscow City Duma. The constituency has covered parts of North-Eastern Moscow since 2014. From 1993-2005 District 12 was based in Eastern Moscow; from 2005-2009 the constituency was based in South-Western Moscow (it actually overlapped the entirety of State Duma Cheryomushki constituency), while from 2009-2014 — in Southern Moscow.

Members elected

Election results

2001

|-
! colspan=2 style="background-color:#E9E9E9;text-align:left;vertical-align:top;" |Candidate
! style="background-color:#E9E9E9;text-align:left;vertical-align:top;" |Party
! style="background-color:#E9E9E9;text-align:right;" |Votes
! style="background-color:#E9E9E9;text-align:right;" |%
|-
|style="background-color:"|
|align=left|Valentina Prisyazhnyuk (incumbent)
|align=left|Yabloko
|
|54.96%
|-
|style="background-color:"|
|align=left|Andrey Kassirov
|align=left|Communist Party
|
|18.67%
|-
|style="background-color:"|
|align=left|Tatyana Aristova
|align=left|Independent
|
|12.46%
|-
|style="background-color:#000000"|
|colspan=2 |against all
|
|11.22%
|-
| colspan="5" style="background-color:#E9E9E9;"|
|- style="font-weight:bold"
| colspan="3" style="text-align:left;" | Total
| 
| 100%
|-
| colspan="5" style="background-color:#E9E9E9;"|
|- style="font-weight:bold"
| colspan="4" |Source:
|
|}

2005

|-
! colspan=2 style="background-color:#E9E9E9;text-align:left;vertical-align:top;" |Candidate
! style="background-color:#E9E9E9;text-align:left;vertical-align:top;" |Party
! style="background-color:#E9E9E9;text-align:right;" |Votes
! style="background-color:#E9E9E9;text-align:right;" |%
|-
|style="background-color:"|
|align=left|Aleksandr Semennikov (incumbent)
|align=left|United Russia
|
|37.88%
|-
|style="background-color:"|
|align=left|Mikhail Gromov
|align=left|Independent
|
|16.93%
|-
|style="background-color:"|
|align=left|Igor Nikulin
|align=left|Rodina
|
|15.77%
|-
|style="background-color:"|
|align=left|Dmitry Katayev (incumbent)
|align=left|Yabloko-United Democrats
|
|14.03%
|-
|style="background-color:"|
|align=left|Tatyana Voyevodina
|align=left|Independent
|
|6.49%
|-
|style="background-color:"|
|align=left|Sergey Gulyaykin
|align=left|Liberal Democratic Party
|
|3.61%
|-
| colspan="5" style="background-color:#E9E9E9;"|
|- style="font-weight:bold"
| colspan="3" style="text-align:left;" | Total
| 
| 100%
|-
| colspan="5" style="background-color:#E9E9E9;"|
|- style="font-weight:bold"
| colspan="4" |Source:
|
|}

2009

|-
! colspan=2 style="background-color:#E9E9E9;text-align:left;vertical-align:top;" |Candidate
! style="background-color:#E9E9E9;text-align:left;vertical-align:top;" |Party
! style="background-color:#E9E9E9;text-align:right;" |Votes
! style="background-color:#E9E9E9;text-align:right;" |%
|-
|style="background-color:"|
|align=left|Oleg Bocharov (incumbent)
|align=left|United Russia
|
|71.28%
|-
|style="background-color:"|
|align=left|Nikolay Taranyov
|align=left|Communist Party
|
|12.04%
|-
|style="background-color:"|
|align=left|Vladimir Zhirnov
|align=left|A Just Russia
|
|8.23%
|-
|style="background-color:"|
|align=left|Ravil Ishmuratov
|align=left|Liberal Democratic Party
|
|5.00%
|-
| colspan="5" style="background-color:#E9E9E9;"|
|- style="font-weight:bold"
| colspan="3" style="text-align:left;" | Total
| 
| 100%
|-
| colspan="5" style="background-color:#E9E9E9;"|
|- style="font-weight:bold"
| colspan="4" |Source:
|
|}

2014

|-
! colspan=2 style="background-color:#E9E9E9;text-align:left;vertical-align:top;" |Candidate
! style="background-color:#E9E9E9;text-align:left;vertical-align:top;" |Party
! style="background-color:#E9E9E9;text-align:right;" |Votes
! style="background-color:#E9E9E9;text-align:right;" |%
|-
|style="background-color:"|
|align=left|Aleksey Shaposhnikov
|align=left|United Russia
|
|52.13%
|-
|style="background-color:"|
|align=left|Yevgeny Marchenko
|align=left|Communist Party
|
|17.35%
|-
|style="background-color:"|
|align=left|Vladimir Khodakov
|align=left|Yabloko
|
|10.20%
|-
|style="background-color:"|
|align=left|Aleksandr Sapronov
|align=left|Liberal Democratic Party
|
|6.24%
|-
|style="background-color:"|
|align=left|Tatyana Fokina
|align=left|A Just Russia
|
|5.82%
|-
|style="background-color:"|
|align=left|Lidia Tafintseva
|align=left|Independent
|
|4.99%
|-
| colspan="5" style="background-color:#E9E9E9;"|
|- style="font-weight:bold"
| colspan="3" style="text-align:left;" | Total
| 
| 100%
|-
| colspan="5" style="background-color:#E9E9E9;"|
|- style="font-weight:bold"
| colspan="4" |Source:
|
|}

2019

|-
! colspan=2 style="background-color:#E9E9E9;text-align:left;vertical-align:top;" |Candidate
! style="background-color:#E9E9E9;text-align:left;vertical-align:top;" |Party
! style="background-color:#E9E9E9;text-align:right;" |Votes
! style="background-color:#E9E9E9;text-align:right;" |%
|-
|style="background-color:"|
|align=left|Aleksey Shaposhnikov (incumbent)
|align=left|Independent
|
|40.83%
|-
|style="background-color:"|
|align=left|Aleksandr Yefimov
|align=left|Communist Party
|
|37.56%
|-
|style="background-color:"|
|align=left|Maksim Yefimov
|align=left|Liberal Democratic Party
|
|7.50%
|-
|style="background-color:"|
|align=left|Nikita Yankovoy
|align=left|A Just Russia
|
|6.77%
|-
|style="background-color:"|
|align=left|Pavel Trofimov
|align=left|Communists of Russia
|
|4.20%
|-
| colspan="5" style="background-color:#E9E9E9;"|
|- style="font-weight:bold"
| colspan="3" style="text-align:left;" | Total
| 
| 100%
|-
| colspan="5" style="background-color:#E9E9E9;"|
|- style="font-weight:bold"
| colspan="4" |Source:
|
|}

Notes

References

Moscow City Duma districts